Helvella latispora is a species of fungi in the family Helvellaceae of the order Pezizales. Ascocarps appear in late summer and autumn as pale stems up to 5 cm in height topped by a greyish saddle shaped cap.

Edibility
Consumption of this fungus is not recommended as similar species in the family Helvellaceae contain the toxin gyromitrin.

References

External links
Index Fungorum

latispora
Fungi of Europe
Fungi described in 1898
Taxa named by Jean Louis Émile Boudier